Italian meal structure is typical of the European Mediterranean region and differs from North, Central, and Eastern European meal structure, though it still often consists of breakfast (colazione), lunch (pranzo), and supper (cena). However, much less emphasis is placed on breakfast, and breakfast itself is often skipped or involves lighter meal portions than are seen in non-Mediterranean Western countries. Late-morning and mid-afternoon snacks, called merenda (plural merende), are also often included in this meal structure.

Traditional meals in Italy typically contained four or five courses. Especially on weekends, meals are often seen as a time to spend with family and friends rather than simply for sustenance; thus, meals tend to be longer than in other cultures. During holidays such as Christmas and New Year's Eve, feasts can last for hours.

Today, full-course meals are mainly reserved for special events such as weddings, while everyday meals include only a first or second course (sometimes both), a side dish, and coffee. The primo (first course) is usually a filling dish such as risotto or pasta, with sauces made from meat, vegetables, or seafood. Whole pieces of meat such as sausages, meatballs, and poultry are eaten in the secondo (second course). Italian cuisine has some single-course meals (piatto unico) combining starches and proteins.

Daytime meal structure

Breakfast (Colazione)

The most popular breakfast (Colazione) nationwide is sweet, consumed at home or at a café. If the breakfast is consumed at home, it consists of coffee (espresso or prepared with a moka pot), milk, or latte accompanied by baked goods such as biscuits, for example shortbread, or by slices of bread spread with butter and jam or with honey or gianduja cream, made with chocolate and hazelnuts. Milk is sometimes replaced by fruit juice. On some special occasions, such as Sundays or holidays, there may also be more baked goods in the house, such as cakes, pies, pastries, or other regional specialties.

If breakfast is consumed at a café, espresso coffee predominates, together with cappuccino or latte macchiato, accompanied by the classic cornetto, bombolone, or other pastry; however, the choice of breakfast desserts is varied, some of which are often present only in certain regions or cities. In recent decades, other types of coffee drinks have also spread, such as mocaccino and marocchino.

Much less frequent, but not completely unusual, is the savory breakfast (although much lighter and frugal than other European savory breakfasts), often consisting of focaccia (of different types and depending on the region) or even just toasted homemade bread and seasoned with extra virgin olive oil, tomato, or sliced salami.

However, many Italians only drink coffee for breakfast without the addition of food.

Lunch (Pranzo)

In Italian culture, lunch (Pranzo) is often considered the most important meal of the day and is, if complete, composed of four courses, namely:

 a first course (Primo), usually a dish based on pasta, risotto, rice, polenta, legumes, or a soup;
 a second course (Secondo), based on meat, fish, dairy products such as cheese, or eggs (served in various ways, such as in a frittata, in a pan, boiled, or scrambled);
 a side dish of raw or cooked vegetables, which accompanies the second dish;
 seasonal fruit as a conclusion.
The second course and the side dish are always accompanied by bread.

It is traditional in Italy that a meal, particularly lunch, be concluded with a cup of espresso or prepared with a caffè mocha, followed by the so-called ammazzacaffè, consisting of a glass of local liqueur, bitter or sweet (of which there is wide choice).

On special occasions, such as holidays and anniversaries, there are also two other courses:

 an appetizer, to whet the appetite before the meal; cold or hot, it is the least abundant course, and is generally composed of crostini, bruschetta, salami and/or sausages, cheeses and/or dairy products, cooked and/or raw vegetables, or preparations based on seafood;
 a dessert to finish;

Wine is often a part of the meal, especially during lunch and dinner.

Mid-afternoon snack (Merenda)

The merenda (from the Latin merenda) is not a main meal, but an important snack in the mid-morning (around 10 o'clock a.m.) or mid-afternoon (around 5 o'clock p.m.). It is usually a light meal, consisting of a panino or tramezzino, fruit alone, or bread and jam, if not some typical dessert and, in summer, possibly ice cream. It is particularly carried out in childhood, but is also quite common among adults.

Supper (Cena)

Along with lunch, it is the other main meal of the day. The supper (Cena) scheme follows that of the classic Italian lunch, therefore with the same courses, but with dishes and foods that are usually lighter.

Exceptions are suppers, called cenoni, consumed on the occasion of certain annual anniversaries such as New Year's Eve, Christmas Eve and the Carnival period; dinners are richer and more substantial than the lunch itself.

Unlike lunch, the Italian supper, when consumed among close family members, does not necessarily include the presence of a first course based on starchy foods (such as pasta or polenta) or cereals (such as rice), so sometimes supper consists of what during lunch would be equivalent to a second course (therefore a meat or fish-based preparation), with or without a side dish, or a single dish, such as a soup or a light soup, however including the presence of bread.

Formal meal structure

A structure of an Italian meal in its full form, usually used during festivities:

Aperitivo The aperitivo opens a meal, and it is similar to an appetizer. Occasionally small amounts of food are consumed, such as olives, crisps, nuts, cheese, sauce dips, little quiches or similar snacks.

Antipasto The antipasto is a slightly heavier starter. It is usually cold and lighter than the first course. Examples of foods eaten are salumi (such as salame, mortadella, prosciutto, bresaola and other charcuterie products), cheeses, sandwich-like foods (panino, bruschetta, crostino), marinated vegetables or fish, cold salmon or prawn cocktails; more elaborate dishes are occasionally prepared.

 A primo is the first course. It consists of hot food and is usually heavier than the antipasto, but lighter than the second course. Non-meat dishes are the staple of any primo piatto: examples are risotto, pasta, seafood or vegetarian sauces, soup and broth, gnocchi, polenta, crespelle, casseroles, or lasagne.

 This course may include different meats and types of fish, including turkey, sausage, pork, steak, stew, beef, zampone, salt cod, stockfish, salmon, lobster, lamb, chicken, or a roast. The primo or the secondo piatto may be considered more important depending on the locality and the situation.

  A contorno is a side dish and is commonly served alongside a secondo piatto. These usually consist of vegetables, raw or cooked, hot or cold. They are usually served on a separate dish, not on the same plate as the meat as in northern European style of presentation.

Insalata If the contorno contained many leafy vegetables, the salad might be omitted. Otherwise, a fresh garden salad could be served at this point.

Formaggi e frutta An entire course is dedicated to local cheeses and fresh seasonal fruit. The cheeses will be whatever is typical of the region (see List of Italian cheeses).

 Next follows the dolce, or dessert. Frequent dishes include tiramisu, panna cotta, cake or pie, panettone or pandoro (the last two are mainly served at Christmas time) and the Colomba Pasquale (an Easter cake). A gelato or a sorbetto can be eaten too. Though there are nationwide desserts, popular across Italy, many regions and cities have local specialties. In Naples, for instance, zeppole and rum baba are popular; in Sicily, cassata and cannoli are commonly consumed; mostarda, on the other hand, is more of a Northern dish.

Caffè Coffee is often drunk at the end of a meal, even after the digestivo. Italians do not have milky coffees or drinks after meals (such as cappuccino or caffè macchiato), but strong coffee such as espresso, which is often drunk very quickly in small cups while still hot.

Digestivo The digestivo, also called ammazzacaffè if served after the coffee, is the drink to conclude the meal. Drinks such as grappa, amaro, limoncello or other fruit/herbal drinks are drunk. Digestivo indicates that the drinks served at this time are meant to ease digestion of a long meal.

See also
 Full course dinner
 Italian cuisine
 Italian food products

References

 
Meals